Fawaz Fallatah (born 8 March 1989) is a Saudi Arabian footballer who currently plays as a defender for Al Orobah.

References

External links 
 

1989 births
Living people
Saudi Arabian footballers
Ohod Club players
Al Hilal SFC players
Al-Raed FC players
Al-Orobah FC players
Al-Faisaly FC players
Al-Qadsiah FC players
Saudi First Division League players
Saudi Professional League players
Association football defenders